Epicrocis oegnusalis is a species of moth of the  family Pyralidae. It is found in Sierra Leone, Angola, South Africa, Zanzibar, Madagascar, India (Punjab, Assam), Sri Lanka, Nepal, Bangladesh, the Andaman Islands, Burma, Thailand, Singapore, China, Taiwan, Indonesia (Sumatra, Java, Wallacea), the Philippines (Luzon, Palawan), New Guinea and Australia.

References

Moths described in 1859
Phycitini
Moths of Australia
Moths of Asia
Moths of the Comoros
Moths of Madagascar
Moths of Indonesia
Moths of Japan
Moths of Singapore
Moths of Africa
Moths of Sri Lanka
Moths of Taiwan